In architecture, a folly is a building constructed primarily for decoration, but suggesting through its appearance some other purpose, or of such extravagant appearance that it transcends the range of usual garden buildings.

Eighteenth-century English landscape gardening and French landscape gardening often featured mock Roman temples, symbolising classical virtues. Other 18th-century garden follies represented Chinese temples, Egyptian pyramids, ruined medieval castles or abbeys, or Tatar tents, to represent different continents or historical eras. Sometimes they represented rustic villages, mills, and cottages to symbolise rural virtues. Many follies, particularly during times of famine, such as the Great Famine in Ireland, were built as a form of poor relief, to provide employment for peasants and unemployed artisans.

In English, the term began as "a popular name for any costly structure considered to have shown folly in the builder", the Oxford English Dictionary's definition, and were often named after the individual who commissioned or designed the project. The connotations of silliness or madness in this definition is in accord with the general meaning of the French word ; however, another older meaning of this word is "delight" or "favourite abode".  This sense included conventional, practical buildings that were thought unduly large or expensive, such as Beckford's Folly, an extremely expensive early Gothic Revival country house that collapsed under the weight of its tower in 1825, 12 years after completion.

As a general term, "folly" is usually applied to a small building that appears to have no practical purpose or the purpose of which appears less important than its striking and unusual design, but the term is ultimately subjective, so a precise definition is not possible.

Characteristics

The concept of the folly is subjective and it has been suggested that the definition of a folly "lies in the eyes of the beholder". Typical characteristics include:

 They have no purpose other than as an ornament. Often they have some of the appearance of a building constructed for a particular purpose, such as a castle or tower, but this appearance is a sham. Equally, if they have a purpose, it may be disguised.
 They are buildings, or parts of buildings. Thus they are distinguished from other garden ornaments such as sculpture.
 They are purpose-built. Follies are deliberately built as ornaments.
 They are often eccentric in design or construction. This is not strictly necessary; however, it is common for these structures to call attention to themselves through unusual details or form.
 There is often an element of fakery in their construction. The canonical example of this is the sham ruin: a folly which pretends to be the remains of an old building but which was in fact constructed in that state.
 They were built or commissioned for pleasure.

History

Follies began as decorative accents on the great estates of the late 16th and early 17th centuries, but they flourished especially in the two centuries which followed. Many estates had ruins of monastic houses and (in Italy) Roman villas; others, lacking such buildings, constructed their own sham versions of these romantic structures.

However, very few follies are completely without a practical purpose. Apart from their decorative aspect, many originally had a use which was lost later, such as hunting towers. Follies are misunderstood structures, according to The Folly Fellowship, a charity that exists to celebrate the history and splendour of these often neglected buildings.

Follies in 18th-century French and English gardens

Follies were an important feature of the English garden and French landscape garden in the 18th century, such as Stowe and Stourhead in England and Ermenonville and the gardens of Versailles in France. They were usually in the form of Roman temples, ruined Gothic abbeys, or Egyptian pyramids. Painshill Park in Surrey contained almost a full set, with a large Gothic tower and various other Gothic buildings, a Roman temple, a hermit's retreat with resident hermit, a Turkish tent, a shell-encrusted water grotto and other features. In France they sometimes took the form of romantic farmhouses, mills and cottages, as in Marie Antoinette's Hameau de la Reine at Versailles. Sometimes they were copied from landscape paintings by painters such as Claude Lorrain and Hubert Robert. Often, they had symbolic importance, illustrating the virtues of ancient Rome, or the virtues of country life. The temple of philosophy at Ermenonville, left unfinished, symbolised that knowledge would never be complete, while the temple of modern virtues at Stowe was deliberately ruined, to show the decay of contemporary morals.

Later in the 18th century, the follies became more exotic, representing other parts of the world, including Chinese pagodas, Japanese bridges, and Tatar tents.

Famine follies
The Great Famine of Ireland of 1845–1849 led to the building of several follies in order to provide relief to the poor without issuing unconditional handouts. However, to hire the needy for work on useful projects would deprive existing workers of their jobs. Thus, construction projects termed "famine follies" came to be built. These included roads in the middle of nowhere, between two seemingly random points, screen and estate walls, piers in the middle of bogs, etc.

Examples

Follies are found worldwide, but they are particularly abundant in Great Britain.

Australia
 Eastlink hotel, in Victoria

Austria
 Roman ruin and gloriettes, in the park of Schönbrunn Palace, Vienna

Canada
 Dundurn Castle in Hamilton, Ontario

Czech Republic

 Series of buildings in Lednice–Valtice Cultural Landscape (UNESCO World Heritage Site)
 Chinese Pavilions in chateau gardens in Vlašim, Děčín Krásný Dvůr

France
 Chanteloup Pagoda, near Amboise
 Désert de Retz, folly garden in Chambourcy near Paris, France (18th century)
 Parc de la Villette in Paris has a number of modern follies by architect Bernard Tschumi.
 Ferdinand Cheval in Châteauneuf-de-Galaure, built what he called an Ideal Palace, seen as an example of naive architecture.
 Hameau de la Reine, in the park of the Château de Versailles
 The Grottoes of Ferrand, in Saint-Hippolyte, Gironde

Germany
 Bergpark Wilhelmshöhe water features
 Lighthouse in the park of Moritzburg Castle near Dresden
 Mosque in the Schwetzingen Castle gardens
 Pfaueninsel artificial ruin, Berlin
 Ruinenberg near Sanssouci Park, Potsdam

Hungary
 Bory Castle at Székesfehérvár
 Taródi Castle at Sopron
 Vajdahunyad vára in the City Park of Budapest

India
 Overbury's Folly, Thalassery, Kerala
 Rock Garden of Chandigarh

Ireland

 Ballysaggartmore Towers, County Waterford
 Carden's Folly
 Casino at Marino
 Conolly's Folly and The Wonderful Barn on the same estate
 Killiney Hill, with several follies
 Larchill in County Kildare, with several follies
 Powerscourt Estate, which contains the Pepperpot Tower
 Saint Anne's Park, which contains a number of follies
 Saint Enda's Park, former school of Patrick Pearse, contains several follies
 The Jealous Wall at Belvedere House near Mullingar, Co. Westmeath

Italy
 La Scarzuola, Montegabbione
 The Park of the Monsters (Bomarzo Gardens)
 Il Giardino dei Tarocchi near Capalbio

Jamaica
 Three follies were built on Folly Estate, Port Antonio, in 1905. They are now in ruins.

Malta

Lija Belvedere Tower

Poland

 Roman aqueduct, Arkadia, Łowicz County
 Temple of the Sibyl in Puławy

Romania
 Iulia Hasdeu Castle

Russia
 Ruined towers in Peterhof, Tsarskoe Selo, Gatchina, and Tsaritsino
 Creaking Pagoda and Chinese Village in Tsarskoe Selo
 Dutch Admiralty in Tsarskoe Selo

Spain

 El Capricho, Comillas (Cantabria)

Ukraine

 Ruins in Oleksandriia, Bila Tserkva

United Kingdom

England

Scotland
 The Caldwell Tower, Lugton, Renfrewshire
 Captain Frasers Folly (Uig Tower) Isle of Skye
 Dunmore Pineapple, Falkirk
 Hume Castle, Berwickshire
 Kinnoull Hill Tower, Perth
 McCaig's Tower, Oban, Argyll and Bute
 National Monument, Edinburgh
 Shaw Monument, Prestwick
 The Temple near Castle Semple Loch, Renfrewshire

Wales

 Clytha Castle, Monmouthshire
Derry Ormond Tower, Ceredigion
 Folly Tower at Pontypool
 Paxton's Tower, Carmarthenshire
 Portmeirion
 Gwrych Castle, Conwy County Borough

United States

 Bancroft Tower, Worcester, Massachusetts
 Belvedere Castle, New York City
 Bishop Castle, outside of Pueblo, Colorado
 Chateau Laroche, Loveland, Ohio
 Italian Barge, Villa Vizcaya, Miami, Florida
 Kingfisher Tower, Otsego Lake (New York)
 Lawson Tower, Scituate, Massachusetts
 Coral Castle, Homestead, Florida
 Summersville Lake Lighthouse, Mount Nebo, West Virginia
 The Parthenon in Nashville, Tennessee
 Hofmann Tower in Lyons, Illinois
 Vessel, New York, New York
 Watts Towers, Watts, Los Angeles
 Körner’s Folly, Kernersville, North Carolina

See also
List of garden features
English garden
Folly Fellowship
French landscape garden
Garden hermit
Goat tower
Grotto
Novelty architecture
Ruin value

References

Bibliography

Barlow, Nick et al. Follies of Europe, Garden Art Press, 2009, 
Barton, Stuart Monumental Follies Lyle Publications, 1972
Folly Fellowship, The Follies Magazine, published quarterly
Folly Fellowship, The Follies Journal, published annually
Folly Fellowship, The Foll-e, an electronic bulletin published monthly and available free to all
Hatt, E. M. Follies National Benzole, London 1963
Headley, Gwyn Architectural Follies in America, John Wiley & Sons, New York 1996
Headley, Gwyn & Meulenkamp, Wim, Follies — A Guide to Rogue Architecture, Jonathan Cape, London 1990
Headley, Gwyn & Meulenkamp, Wim, Follies — A National Trust Guide, Jonathan Cape, London 1986
Headley, Gwyn & Meulenkamp, Wim, Follies Grottoes & Garden Buildings, Aurum Press, London 1999
Howley, James The Follies and Garden Buildings of Ireland Yale University Press, New Haven & London, 1993
Jackson, Hazelle Shellhouses and Grottoes, Shire Books, England, 2001
Jones, Barbara Follies & Grottoes Constable, London 1953 & 1974
Meulenkamp, Wim Follies — Bizarre Bouwwerken in Nederland en België, Arbeiderpers, Amsterdam, 1995

External links

 
Landscape garden features
Landscape design history
Building types